Mariel Maciá (born 24 August 1980) is an Argentine-Spanish film director, theater director, screenwriter, and producer.

Biography
As of 2018, Mariel Maciá has written and directed six short films. The first of them, Despedida (o la crisis argentina), was released in 2003. El gran plan (o las parejas de Ana) (2005), Leo y Abril (o la historia de un guión) (2006), and Dos extraños (o como nos conocimos) (2006) complete the first part of her work.

In 2006 her short film Flores en el parque (o los primeros besos) obtained more than 600,000 views on YouTube. It was entered in film festivals, culminating in seven awards:

 LesGaiCineMad (Madrid, Spain): Best Spanish Work and Best Short Film
  (Huelva, Spain): Chameleon of the Official Jury for the Best Short Film on Video
 QCinema International Festival (Texas, United States): Best Dramatic Short Film
 Dunas Short Film Festival (Fuerteventura, Spain): Best Female Performance (Diana Díez)
 CineGaiLast Festival (Gijón, Spain): Best Short Film
 International Short Film Festival of São Paulo (São Paulo, Brazil): Silver Rabbit for Best Short Film

In 2007 she wrote, produced, and directed the short film A domicilio (o incluso también el amor). It premiered at LesGaiCineMad and was subsequently entered in other LGBT film festivals such as Outfest (Los Angeles, United States), Frameline (San Francisco, United States), and the London Lesbian and Gay Film Festival (London, United Kingdom). It received the following awards:

 LesGaiCineMad (Madrid, Spain): Best Spanish Work and Best Short Film
 International Cineffable Festival (Paris, France): Best Medium-length Fiction Film
 Long Island Gay and Lesbian Film Festival (New York, United States): Best Female Short Film
  (Gran Canaria, Spain): Best Short Film
In 2008 Maciá premiered the play Monólogos de Bollería Fina at the Madrid Pride Day and it returned to be revived at the 2010 Pride Day.

Subsequently, she has participated regularly in round tables, seminars, and congresses related to films made by women and new technologies.

She served as a member of the CIMA Board of Directors in 2011.

Filmography
 2003 – Despedida (o la crisis argentina) (short)
 2005 – El gran plan (o las parejas de Ana) (short)
 2006 – Leo y Abril (o la historia de un guión) (short)
 2006 – Dos extraños (o como nos conocimos) (short)
 2006 – Flores en el parque (o los primeros besos) (short)
 2007 – A domicilio (o incluso también el amor) (short)

References

External links
 
 

1980 births
21st-century Argentine women writers
21st-century Argentine writers
21st-century Spanish women writers
Living people
Argentine expatriates in Germany
Argentine film directors
Argentine screenwriters
Argentine lesbian writers
Argentine lesbian artists
Argentine theatre directors
Argentine women film directors
Argentine women film producers
Lesbian screenwriters
Argentine LGBT screenwriters
LGBT theatre directors
LGBT film directors
People from Salta
Spanish lesbian writers
Spanish lesbian artists
Spanish theatre directors
Spanish women film directors
Spanish women screenwriters
Spanish LGBT screenwriters
Women theatre directors
21st-century Spanish screenwriters